Club Atlético Pulpileño is a football team based in Pulpí, Almería, but has its headquarters in Pozo de la Higuera, Murcia. Founded in 2002, the team plays in Segunda División RFEF – Group 5. The club's home ground is Estadio San Miguel.

Season to season

1 season in Segunda División RFEF
12 seasons in Tercera División

Noted players
 Anselmo (2010)
  Lawrence Doe (2008–2009, 2010)
 Emmanuel Mendy (2016–)

References

External links
Futbolme team profile 

Football clubs in the Region of Murcia
Association football clubs established in 2002
2002 establishments in Spain